Hayes Brake is a Milwaukee, Wisconsin designer and manufacturer of disc brakes and disc brake systems for non-automotive applications, including Hayes Disc Brake specialising in disc brakes for bikes. In 2005 the company's nine-member management team bought Hayes Brake with Nautic Partners, a private equity firm, and renamed the company HB Performance Systems Inc. 

Hayes Bicycle Group has acquired Sun Ringle hubs, rims, wheels and components, WheelSmith Fabrications, Inc. and Answer/Manitou.

References

External links
Hayes Brake official website
Disc brakes for bikes

Companies established in 1984
Cycle parts manufacturers
Cycle manufacturers of the United States
Manufacturing companies based in Milwaukee